The Surface Water and Ocean Topography (SWOT) mission is a satellite altimeter jointly developed and operated by NASA and CNES, the French space agency, in partnership with the Canadian Space Agency (CSA) and UK Space Agency (UKSA). The objectives of the mission are to make the first global survey of the Earth's surface water, to observe the fine details of the ocean surface topography, and to measure how terrestrial surface water bodies change over time. 

While past satellite missions like the Jason series altimeters (TOPEX/Poseidon, Jason-1, Jason-2, Jason-3) have provided variation in river and lake water surface elevations at select locations, SWOT will provide the first truly global observations of changing water levels, stream slopes, and inundation extents in rivers, lakes, and floodplains. Because it uses wide-swath altimetry technology, SWOT will almost completely observe the world's oceans and freshwater bodies with repeated high-resolution elevation measurements, allowing observations of variations.

Context 
SWOT builds on a long-standing partnership between NASA and CNES to measure the surface of the ocean using radar altimetry. This partnership began with the TOPEX/Poseidon mission (launched in 1992) and continued with the Jason series. SWOT brings together the hydrology and oceanography communities and will extend the precise, high-resolution surface topography observations into the coastal and estuarine regions.

Scientific objectives 
The mission's science goals are to:
 The satellite will overfly Earth from 78° S to 78° N, covering at least 86% of the globe.

SWOT retraces the same path over the Earth's surface every 21 days, during 292 orbits. It is designed for a mission lifetime of three years.

Mission 
SWOT is designed for the study and monitoring of inland waters and the oceans, such as:

 Management of water-sharing issues
The sharing of river water often causes friction between neighboring states, especially when there is no common technology for verification. SWOT will provide global information as input for systems monitoring transboundary river basins, including measurements of variations in reservoir water storage and estimates of river discharge.

 More accurate weather and climate forecasting
SWOT will enable more accurate weather and climate forecasting, especially seasonally. The quality of weather and climate forecasting largely depends on numerical modeling that uses the state of the ocean surface and the hydrological conditions of catchment areas in their initial and boundary conditions.

 Managing freshwater for urban, industrial, and agricultural consumption
Accurate knowledge of sources of available water is a key factor in decision-making for organizations involved in the distribution of water for agricultural, urban, and industrial needs. Data from SWOT will contribute at a global level by providing water supply services and distribution companies with information about major reservoirs and the largest rivers and catchment areas, thus enabling them to plan the management of water stocks further into the future.

 Improved flood modeling
Flooding, whether from rivers overflowing their banks or in coastal regions, is among the most costly natural disasters. Altimetry data from the SWOT mission will make it possible to measure the 3-dimensional shape of flood waves, track floodwater levels, and improve measurements of local topographic details in floodplains. All of these will improve prediction capabilities for future floods.

 Coastal ocean dynamics
Coastal ocean dynamics are important for many societal applications. They have smaller spatial and temporal scales than the dynamics of the open ocean and require finer-scale monitoring. SWOT will provide global, high-resolution observations in coastal regions for observing coastal currents and storm surges. While SWOT is not designed to monitor the fast temporal changes of the coastal processes, the swath coverage will allow us to characterize the spatial structure of their dynamics when they occur within the swath.

 Reducing environmental risk and contributing to public policy-making
More generally, SWOT will help improve our knowledge of Earth's water cycle and ocean circulation, enhance our observation capacity by collecting unique data on water storage and fluxes and making them freely available, and help us better understand the physics that drives surface water and ocean dynamics. Water resources, natural risks (floods, climate change, hurricane forecasting, etc.), biodiversity, health (preventing the propagation of water-borne diseases), the agricultural sector, energy (including the management of electricity production and offshore gas and oil rigs), territorial development; all these areas and more stand to benefit from this new satellite mission.

Sensor payload 

The primary instrument on SWOT is the Ka-band Radar Interferometer (KaRIn), which uses synthetic-aperture radar (SAR) technology, especially SAR interferometry. Because SWOT operates at Ka-band's relatively short wavelengths,  – compared to the Ku-band Jason series,  – and at near-nadir incidence angles (<5°), it is designed to be uniquely appropriate for measuring water surface elevations and inundation extents. 

The new radar system is smaller than, but similar to, the one that flew on NASA's Shuttle Radar Topography Mission (SRTM), which made high-resolution measurements of Earth's land surface in 2000. 

A conventional nadir radar altimeter will also be flown, and measure just beneath the satellite, as was done on the Topex/Poseidon, Jason series, and SARAL missions.

History 
SWOT was developed by an international group of hydrologists and oceanographers to provide a better understanding of the world's oceans and its terrestrial surface waters. It will give scientists their first comprehensive view of Earth's freshwater bodies from space and much more detailed measurements of the ocean surface than ever before. By 2019 the mission hardware was under active construction, algorithms to produce hydrology and oceanography data products were under final development, and calibration/validation methods and post-launch activities were being finalized. The spacecraft launched on a SpaceX Falcon 9 on 16 December 2022.

Mating 

The mating of the payload made by Jet Propulsion Laboratory (JPL) took place on 11 August 2021 at Thales Alenia Space Cannes Center, France.

See also 

 Jason-3

References

External links 
 Surface Water and Ocean Topography at NASA.gov
 Ocean Surface Topography from Space at NASA.gov
 Cnes project Library at CNES.fr
 AVISO+ portal for SWOT

NASA programs
Earth satellite radar altimeters
Spacecraft launched in 2022
CNES
Synthetic aperture radar satellites
Interferometers